Wettengel Rugby Field is a multi-use stadium in Dededo, Guam. It is currently used mostly for rugby and football matches. The stadium holds 1,500 people. It is named for the former Naval Governor of Guam, Ivan Wettengel. It has also held Guam junior rugby middle school games.

Football venues in Guam
Rugby union stadiums in Guam